Johnnie Blakeney Rawlinson (born December 16, 1952) is a United States circuit judge of the United States Court of Appeals for the Ninth Circuit and a former United States District Judge of the United States District Court for the District of Nevada.

Early life
Rawlinson was born in Concord, North Carolina. She received a B.S. from North Carolina A&T State University in 1974. She received a J.D. from University of the Pacific, McGeorge School of Law in 1979. She was in private practice of law in Las Vegas, Nevada from 1979 to 1980. In 1980, Rawlinson and Viveca Monet Woods became the first African American women admitted to practice law in Nevada. Rawlinson was a staff attorney of Nevada Legal Services, Las Vegas, Nevada in 1980. She worked at the Office of the District Attorney, Las Vegas, Nevada from 1980 to 1998. She was a deputy district attorney from 1980 to 1989, and a chief deputy district attorney from 1989 to 1995. She was an assistant district attorney from 1995 to 1998.

Education and career
Rawlinson received most of her education in North Carolina, where she earned her Bachelor of Science degree summa cum laude from North Carolina Agricultural and Technical State University in 1974. She graduated with distinction from the McGeorge School of Law at the University of the Pacific, receiving her Juris Doctor in 1979.

She had served as deputy district attorney and chief deputy for over 17 years in the office of the Clark County District Attorney in Las Vegas, Nevada, as well as receiving law practice as a clerk at Kiefer Clark & O'Reilly and other legal services throughout the United States prior to her appointments. She served as a United States district judge after being nominated by President Clinton and confirmed by the United States Senate in 1997. She was the first female judge to serve on the United States District Court for the District of Nevada.

In 2016, Judge Rawlinson received a Master of Judicial Studies degree from Duke University School of Law.

Federal judicial service

District court service
Rawlinson was a federal judge to the United States District Court for the District of Nevada. Rawlinson was nominated by President Bill Clinton on January 27, 1998, to a seat vacated by Lloyd D. George. She was confirmed by the United States Senate on April 2, 1998, and received commission on April 7, 1998. Rawlinson's service was terminated on July 26, 2000, due to elevation to the Ninth Circuit Court.

Court of appeals service
Rawlinson was nominated by President Bill Clinton on February 22, 2000, to a seat on the United States Court of Appeals for the Ninth Circuit after being recommended for the post by United States Senator Harry Reid. Rawlinson was nominated to a seat vacated by Melvin T. Brunetti. Rawlinson was confirmed by the United States Senate by a voice vote on July 21, 2000, making her the final appeals-court nominee to be confirmed during Clinton's presidency. She received her commission on July 26, 2000.  Rawlinson subsequently took the oath of office on the same day, becoming the first African American woman to sit on the Ninth Circuit.

On April 14, 2022, news reports stated Rawlinson suggested she would consider assuming senior status, creating a vacancy for her seat on the United States Court of Appeals for the Ninth Circuit, if Berna Rhodes-Ford, former law clerk and wife of Aaron D. Ford, would be nominated as her successor.

Personal life

Rawlinson resides in Las Vegas. Her husband of 40 years, Dwight Rawlinson, had cancer and died in August 2016.

See also
 Barack Obama Supreme Court candidates
 List of African-American federal judges
 List of African-American jurists
 List of first women lawyers and judges in Nevada

References

External links

1952 births
African-American judges
Judges of the United States Court of Appeals for the Ninth Circuit
Judges of the United States District Court for the District of Nevada
Living people
McGeorge School of Law alumni
North Carolina A&T State University alumni
People from Concord, North Carolina
United States court of appeals judges appointed by Bill Clinton
United States district court judges appointed by Bill Clinton
20th-century American judges
20th-century American women judges
21st-century American women judges
21st-century American judges